The Great Western Railway (GWR) 3901 Class is a class of 2-6-2T steam locomotives rebuilt from class 2301 'Dean Goods' 0-6-0 tender locomotives.

In 1907, a surplus of Dean Goods locomotives, and a requirement for more suburban tank locos, led to the rebuilding of twenty of the Dean Goods into 2-6-2T 'Prairie' tank locos. The inside cylinders and motion were retained, the frames were extended at each end, and leading and trailing pony trucks added, as were a Standard number 5 boiler, full-length side tanks (with a large cut-out to give access for oiling the motion) and a bunker. Locomotives 2491-2510 were rebuilt and renumbered 3901–3920. The locomotives were allocated to the Birmingham area to replace older 2-4-2T locomotives, having the advantage of greater adhesive weight.

Most remained in the Birmingham area until 1923, when they began to be sent elsewhere, and replaced by the Large Prairies. All the class was withdrawn between 1931 and 1934, and scrapped.

Notes

References 

3901
2-6-2T locomotives
Standard gauge steam locomotives of Great Britain
Railway locomotives introduced in 1907

Rebuilt locomotives
Scrapped locomotives